The 1939 BYU Cougars football team was an American football team that represented Brigham Young University (BYU) as a member of the Mountain States Conference (MSC) during the 1939 college football season.   their third season under head coach Eddie Kimball, the Cougars compiled am overall record of 5–2–2 with a mark of 2–2–2 against conference opponents, finished fourth in the MSC, and outscored opponents by a total of 110 to 90.

Sophomore left halfback George Wing led the team on offense.

Schedule

References

BYU
BYU Cougars football seasons
BYU Cougars football